MSG Sphere may refer to:

MSG Sphere at The Venetian, a music venue being built in Las Vegas
MSG Sphere London, a proposed music venue in London